Sobradinho II is an administrative region in the Federal District in Brazil.

References

External links
 Regional Administration of Sobradinho II website
 Government of the Federal District website

Administrative regions of Federal District (Brazil)
Populated places established in 2003